The Netherlands men's national pitch and putt team represents the Netherlands in the pitch and putt international competitions. It is managed by the Netherlands Federation of Pitch and putt (PPBN).

In 1999 it was one of the founders of the European Pitch and Putt Association, the governing body that develops the pitch and putt in Europe and stages the European Team Championship, where the Netherlands reached the second place in 2005. In 2006 participated in the creation of the Federation of International Pitch and Putt Associations (FIPPA), that stages the World Cup Team Championship. The Netherlands obtained the second place in 2004 and 2008.

National team

Players
National team in the European Championship 2010
Rolf Kwant
Henk Rik Koetsier
Patrick Luning
Marcel Ahuis
Rinus Huberts
Lennart Swennenhuis

National team in the World Cup 2008
Patrick Luning 
Jan Tijhuis 
Rolf Kwant

National team in the European Championship 2007
Rolf Kwant
Patrick Lunning
Karl Bergh
Lennart Swennenhuis
Jan Tijhuis
Henk-Rik Koetsier

See also
World Cup Team Championship
European Team Championship

External links
NPPB The Netherlands Federation of Pitch and Putt
FIPPA Federation of International Pitch and Putt Associations website
EPPA European Pitch and Putt Association website

National pitch and putt teams
Pitch and putt